Dipperz is a municipality in the district of Fulda in Hesse in Germany.

References

Municipalities in Hesse
Fulda (district)